IV liga Mazovia groups (grupa mazowiecka) includes two of the groups of IV liga, the 5th level of Polish football league system. 
The leagues were created in season 2000/2001 after introducing new administrative division of Poland. Until the end of the 2007/08 season IV liga lay at 4th tier of league system but this was changed with the formation of the Ekstraklasa as the top level league in Poland.
The clubs from Mazovian Voivodeship compete in these groups. The winner of the play-off is promoted to III liga group I. The bottom teams are relegated to the groups of Liga okręgowa from Mazovian Voivodeship. These groups are Ciechanów-Ostrołęka, Płock, Radom, Siedlce, Warszawa I and Warszawa II.

Season 2000/01

Season 2001/02

Season 2002/03

Season 2003/04

Season 2004/05

Season 2005/06

Season 2006/07

Season 2007/08

Season 2008/09 
IV liga became the 5th level of Polish football league system due to the formation of Ekstraklasa as the top level league in Poland.

Season 2009/10

Season 2010/11

Season 2011/12

Season 2012/13

Season 2013/14

Season 2014/15

Season 2015/16

Season 2016/17

Season 2017/18

Season 2018/19

Season 2019/20 
Group North
The 2019–20 season did not reassume in March 2020 after the winter break, because of the COVID-19 pandemic in Poland. A select few matches were played in June 2020 to decide promotion.

 1. Drukarz Warszawa 	 	18 	12 	5 	1 	32-14 	41 	
 2. Huragan Wołomin 	 	18 	11 	6 	1 	39-14 	39 	
 3. Mazovia Mińsk Mazowiecki 	18 	10 	2 	6 	46-27 	32 	
 4. Hutnik Warszawa 	 	18 	10 	2 	6 	43-29 	32 	
 5. KS Łomianki 	 	 	15 	8 	5 	2 	29-18 	29 	
 6. MKS Przasnysz 	 	15 	8 	4 	3 	33-10 	28 	
 7. Ząbkovia Ząbki 	 	15 	8 	2 	5 	39-20 	26 	
 8. Pogoń II Siedlce 	 	15 	7 	3 	5 	23-19 	24 	
 9. Wisła II Płock 	 	15 	5 	4 	6 	27-25 	19 	
 10. Makowianka Maków Mazowiecki 15 	4 	5 	6 	26-39 	17 	
 11. Wkra Żuromin 	 	15 	4 	3 	8 	26-40 	15 	
 12. Nadnarwianka Pułtusk 	15 	2 	6 	7 	16-28 	12 	
 13. Korona Ostrołęka 	 	15 	2 	5 	8 	13-29 	11 	
 14. Podlasie Sokołów Podlaski 	15 	2 	4 	9 	16-33 	10 	
 15. Świt Staroźreby 	 	15 	2 	4 	9 	15-29 	10 	
 16. Ożarowianka Ożarów Mzwck. 	15 	1 	0 	14 	11-60 	3 	

Group South
The 2019–20 season did not reassume in March 2020 after the winter break, because of the COVID-19 pandemic in Poland. A select few matches were played in June 2020 to decide promotion.

 1. Błonianka Błonie 		17 	12 	2 	3 	52-20 	38 	(promoted)
 2. MKS Piaseczno 		17 	10 	5 	2 	48-25 	35
 3. Radomiak II Radom 		15 	9 	5 	1 	27-13 	32
 4. Victoria Sulejówek 		17 	10 	1 	6 	45-28 	31
 5. Pilica Białobrzegi 		15 	8 	3 	4 	37-24 	27 	
 6. Oskar Przysucha 		15 	7 	5 	3 	36-27 	26 7. Wilga Garwolin 		15 	7 	2 	6 	30-32 	23 8. Mszczonowianka Mszczonów 	15 	6 	4 	5 	23-22 	22 9. KS Warka 			15 	4 	5 	6 	19-37 	17 10. KS Raszyn 			15 	5 	2 	8 	20-27 	17 11. Mazur Karczew 		15 	4 	3 	8 	19-23 	15 12. Proch Pionki 		15 	4 	3 	8 	18-25 	15 13. Znicz II Pruszków 		15 	4 	3 	8 	17-29 	15 14. Żyrardowianka Żyrardów 	15 	3 	3 	9 	20-34 	12 15. Józefovia Józefów 		15 	2 	4 	9 	11-28 	10 16. Unia Warszawa 		15 	1 	4 	10 	8-36 	7'''

Season 2020/21

Season 2021/22

References

Football_leagues_in_Poland
Sport in Masovian_Voivodeship